SLINEX (Sri Lanka India Naval Exercise) are a series of naval exercises between the Indian Navy and the Sri Lanka Navy. The first SLINEX exercise took place in 2005. The eighth edition took place in 2020.

SLINEX 2013 
SLINEX-13 was conducted off the coast of Goa from 04 – 07 Nov 13.

INS Talwar and SLNS Sagara participated in the exercise. The exercise was conducted over two phases with the harbour phase from 04 - 05 Nov 13 and the sea phase with debrief from 06 - 07 Nov 13.

The major activities conducted as part of the exercise were replenishment at sea approaches, visit, board, search, and seizure exercise, surface firing on a floating target, flying operations and asymmetric threat operations.

SLINEX 2015
The fourth SLINEX took place between October 27 and November 15, 2015, off Trincomalee, Sri Lanka. The vessels taking part included SLNS Sayura, SLNS Samudura, SLNS Sagara, INS Kora, INS Kirpan and INS Savitri.

SLINEX 2018
SLINEX 2018 took place between September 7 to 13, 2018, off Trincomalee, Sri Lanka. The vessels taking part included SLNS Sayurala, SLNS Samudura, SLNS Suranimala, INS Sumitra, INS Kirch and INS Cora together with 2 Dornier air crafts and a helicopter of the Indian Navy.

SLINEX 2020
The navies of India and Sri Lanka with anti-submarine warfare corvettes INS Kamorta and INS Kiltan as well as offshore patrol vessel Sayura and training ship Gajabahu respectively begin a three-day exercise Slinex 2020 to highlight growing congruence. The eighth edition was scheduled off Trincomalee, Sri Lanka from October 19 to 21.

References

Sri Lanka Navy
Indian naval exercises
Military exercises and wargames
Military education and training in India
India–Sri Lanka relations
Indian military exercises